Watrous Airport  is located  east of Watrous, Saskatchewan, Canada.

See also 
 List of airports in Saskatchewan

References 

Registered aerodromes in Saskatchewan
Usborne No. 310, Saskatchewan